The 2010–11 season was Brisbane Roar's 6th season in the A-League. On Friday 4 February 2011, Brisbane Roar were confirmed as Premiers with two games remaining in the regular season. The seasons' Premiers Plate is the first piece of silverware for the club and meant automatic qualification for the group stages of the 2012 Asian Champions League. After a thrilling grand final which went to a penalty shootout, the Roar prevailed and were crowned A-League Champions.

Squad Lineup for 2010/11
Correct as of 1 January 2011 – players numbers as per the official Brisbane Roar website

 (Vice Captain)

 
 

 

 

Current Trialists
 n/a

Unsuccessful Trialists
 Dean Evans from Perth Glory Youth Team
 Ludovic Boi from Perth Glory Youth Team
 Daniel Visevic from Richmond SC
 Adrian Zahra from Melbourne Knights
 Nathan Sherlock from Sydney FC Youth Team
 Kim Min Kyum from Chunnam Dragons
 Waldemar Acosta – Free Agent

Transfers

In

Out

Season

Season recap
The club faced the losses of top scorer Sergio van Dijk to A-League team Adelaide United, and established youngsters Tommy Oar, Michael Zullo and Adam Sarota to overseas club FC Utrecht. Despite losing some of the team's forwards; new signings and a restructure in formations saw the Roar start the season well and playing an entertaining brand of football. On 20 October, Roar defeated Central Coast Mariners 2–0, with strikes from Thomas Broich and Ivan Franjic. After 1/3 of the way through the season, Brisbane Roar continue to play beautiful football after drawing 1–1 against Sydney FC at the SFS on 30 October. Following that result, Brisbane had racked up six wins, five draws and a solitary loss to the Melbourne Victory in Melbourne on 12 September. On 3 November 2010, Brisbane ended Wellington Phoenix's record home undefeated record of 24 games as the Roar defeated the Phoenix 4–1.

Following the third game in eight days, the Roar thrashed Adelaide United 4–0 with a 10-man squad. Striker Reinaldo was sent off in the second-half following the first goal in the first half. The crowd for the game was the biggest for the Roar in the season so far with 13,248 attending. Adelaide United coach Rini Coolen credited the way the Roar play, saying "They are definitely the best team we've played against and definitely the best team in the league. It was too much for us today and 4–0 was a fair result. They're getting better and better. The way they play, the movement, the transition movement, it's a real high level. It's the biggest level here in our league and it's definitely a kind of level that belongs to Europe."

On 28 November 2010, against Central Coast Mariners, the Brisbane Roar broke another record by going undefeated in 14 matches, beating the previous record of 13 set by Adelaide United earlier in the season. The match ended 5–1. The Roar would follow up their record run against Melbourne Victory, drawing 3–3 at the death in a heated match with Matt McKay scoring with the last kick of the game to ensure Brisbane would stretch their unbeaten period to 15 matches. There was a number of controversies in the match, both on and off the field. The first came when Roar goalkeeper Michael Theoklitos appeared to catch the ball while being outside his penalty box which the referee appeared to have missed or waved away. Michael Theoklitos then booted the ball down field where Reinaldo would nod the ball onto an on running Matt McKay to level the match despite efforts by Michael Petkovic and the Victory defence. The second would come at the end of the match with hardman Kevin Muscat punching Roar goalkeeping coach Fernando Vaz Alves in the stomach during an altercation. Muscat received an official reprimand and a $1,500 fine.

The Roar would break another record on 12 December 2010, by grabbing their first win in the A-League at the Sydney Football Stadium, defeating Sydney FC 1–0. The win would see another record brought into the light, becoming only the 2nd club behind South Melbourne FC in the 2000/01 season, coincidentally coached at the time by current Roar coach Ange Postecoglou, by going 16 matches undefeated in an Australian league. It was revealed on 15 December 2010, after he had been left out of the lineup altogether for the match against Sydney FC a few days before, that Reinaldo had played his last game for the Roar after signing a 2-year, $2,000,000 contract for Qatari club Al Ahli. In the second M1 Derby of the season on Boxing Day, 2010, The Roar played out a spectacular 2–2 draw with the Gold Coast United, with some labeling it one of the best matches of the season to date. What added more to the match was that it was played in torrential rain. The rain bucketed down without reprieve for the whole match, with the lines on the pitch having to be remarked at both the half time interval and the 82nd minute. The result extended the Roar's record unbeaten run to 18 matches

With the departure of Reinaldo to Qatari club Al-Ahli, youth team captain Chris Bush was brought into the senior team to make up the minimum squad number of 20. With the 2010–11 Queensland floods wreaking havoc in South East Queensland and other parts of the state, the Roar were left without a home ground to play at after Suncorp Stadium was flooded in and also caught fire due to a small explosion in an isolated transformer room. The Roar's fixtures that were disrupted were changed with the initial match between the Roar and Wellington Phoenix being moved from 16 to 26 January in a hope the stadium would be ready to house the fixture. The match was later moved to Skilled Park by the FFA with the Roar's next match, also a home fixture, being moved back a day to the 29th from the 28th, also at the same venue.

On Australia Day 2011, Brisbane Roar had a bitter sweet meeting with Wellington Phoenix in a rescheduled fixture at Skilled Park due to the 2010–11 Queensland floods. Although winning the fixture 2–0 with both goals by supersub James Meyer, it would see the farewell of solid defender Luke DeVere, Brisbane Roar's 2009–2010 player of the season, who departed for Korean club Gyeongnam. On 29 January 2011, Brisbane Roar would beat the longest unbeaten streak by an Australian football team, held by APIA Leichhardt in the 1986–87 NSL season, by going 23 games undefeated. On Friday 4 February 2011, Brisbane Roar were confirmed as Premiers with two games remaining in the regular season as second placed Central Coast Mariners failed to beat Melbourne Heart. The seasons' Premiers Plate is the first piece of silverware for the club and meant automatic qualification for the group stages of the 2012 Asian Champions League.

On 7 February 2011, Brisbane Roar youth team player Daniel Bowles signed a 1-year contract as a replacement for the departed Luke DeVere. On 10 February 2011, Brisbane Roar signed Matthew Jurman for the 2011/2012 season, with the young defender joining the team on a 2-year deal after Sydney FC's 2011 Asian Champions League campaign. On 12 February 2011, the Brisbane Roar W League team won its second championship in 3 years by beating Sydney FC 2–1 in the grand final at Campbelltown Stadium. The same night, the Roar would record their first win in the M1 Derby by defeating Gold Coast United for the first time on return to Suncorp Stadium after the 2010–11 Queensland floods in a resounding 4–0 victory in front of their best crowd of the regular season of 20,831. After the game, the Roar were presented with the Premier's Plate, after a fantastic season where the Roar only lost 1 game.

At the PFA Team of the Year presentation, 7 Brisbane Roar players out of the possible 11 starting lineup were selected with Roar skipper Matt McKay being chosen to captain the side. The other players in the starting side in a 4–3–3 formation were Michael Theoklitos, Ivan Franjic, Luke DeVere and Matt Smith, Matt McKay, Thomas Broich and Kosta Barbarouses. Roar striker Jean Carlos Solórzano, on loan from Costa Rican side L.D. Alajuelense made it onto the bench of 5 with Ange Postecoglou being named as coach. Unrecognised at the PFA Awards was the fact the Brisbane Roar took out both the best defence and best attack in the season, with 58 goals scored and 26 conceded respectively. The Roar also won the A-League Fair-Play Trophy for the season, being the most disciplined in the league.

On 26 February 2011, the Brisbane Roar would draw 2–2 with the Central Coast Mariners in the 2nd Leg of the major semi-final, winning the tie 4–2 on aggregate after defeating the Mariners 2–0 in the 1st leg at Bluetongue Stadium. The win in the tie means the Roar will have a weeks break before hosting the grand final on Sunday, 13 March 2011 at Suncorp Stadium. On 5 March 2011, Central Coast Mariners would win the rights to face Brisbane in the 2010–11 A-League grand final, defeating Gold Coast United 1–0 at Bluetongue Stadium. The following day at the annual A League awards night, the presentation for all of the awards for both the A-League and W-League, the Roar collected 4 awards. The club had won the A-League Fair-Play Trophy along with Ange Postecoglou being named Manager of the Year. The other two awards would go to Michael Theoklitos and Erik Paartalu respectively. The former would be named Goalkeeper of the Year and the latter picking up the Solo Goal of the Year award with his stunning volley into the top corner of the net against Gold Coast United in the final game of the regular season.

To top off a remarkable season, Brisbane would go on to win the 2011 A-League grand final, and in one of the most spectacular fashions ever seen in Australian football. After finishing 0–0 in regular play, the game went to extra time, with the Mariners scoring twice in the first period, and looked to have sealed the game. But with only four minutes of play left, Brisbane netted home what looked to be a consolation goal through Henrique, before Erik Paartalu headed in a corner from the last play of the game to make it 2–2. The game went on to penalties. Roar Goalkeeper of the Year Michael Theoklitos saved 2 penalty shots to win 4–2 in the penalty shootout. In front of a 50,168 record crowd for both the Roar and football in Brisbane, Ange Postecoglou would be left in awe, saying "We've had an absolutely extraordinary season, so I should have expected an extraordinary finish." The Roar were given the keys to the city after winning the grand final, with the presentation of the key including a tickertape parade to honour the team for their success.

The future surrounding Ange Postecoglou's future at the club were ended on 18 March 2011, when it was announced by both the FFA, who were financially aiding the club after the Roar's license was taken back to ease the burden on the owners, and the club that the reigning Manager of the Year had signed a 2-year addition to his current contract that would see him at the helm for the Roar until the end of the 2013–14 season, assuring he would coach the team through the 2012 Asian Champions League.

At the Roar's end of season awards night, German import Thomas Broich would take home the coveted Gary Wilkins Medal as the best player of the season. Captain Matt McKay would pick up two awards, winning both the Player's Player Awards and the Member's Player of the Year Award. Kiwi Kosta Barbarouses would pick up the clubs Golden Boot by scoring 12 goals, edging out Jean Carlos Solórzano by 1 goal, despite being tied with him on 11 at the end of the regular season. Barbarouses would score against the Central Coast Mariners in the 1st leg of the major semi-final at Bluetongue Stadium to take home the award. English born defender Matt Smith would pick up the Queensland Roars Against Racism Ambassador Award as well as young defender James Donachie picking up the Youth League Player of the Year Award. Matilda Elise Kellond-Knight picked up the W League Player of the Year Award with teammate Aivi Luik picking up the W League Player's Player Award.

Pre-Season

Roar Roadshow

Translink Cup
On 30 April 2010, Everton FC confirmed on their official website that they would be touring Australia as part of their pre-season for their 2010–11 Premier League campaign. Everton's tour included a match against the Brisbane Roar at Suncorp Stadium on 10 July 2010 where they contested the Translink Cup. The match was later changed to 17 July 2010.

2010–11 A-League

Finals series

Brisbane Roar advance to host the grand final by winning the tie 4–2 on aggregate 

Brisbane Roar won on Penalties

Statistics

Starting XI

Goalscorers 

Ivan Franjic, Erik Paartalu, Matt McKay and Henrique scored in the 4–2 Penalty shootout in the grand final

Home attendance
Correct as of 13 March 2011 (grand final)
** Denotes midweek fixture

Ladder

References 

2010-11
2010–11 A-League season by team